Keith Reginald Benson (25 October 1917 – 18 December 1990) was an Australian rugby league footballer who played in the 1940s.

Benson was an ex Rugby Union first grade player and local athlete that swapped to Rugby League in 1940.  He played many games in all grades for the St. George DRLFC but his career was affected by his service in World War II. He was still in the lower grades in the mid-1940s, before retiring. 

Benson died on 18 December 1990.

References

1917 births
1990 deaths
Australian rugby league players
Rugby league players from Sydney
St. George Dragons players
Rugby league centres
Australian Army personnel of World War II
Australian Army soldiers